The Krupa Monastery is a Serbian Orthodox monastery on the Krupa River in Croatia. It is the oldest Orthodox monastery in Croatia.

Location 
It is located on the southern slopes of the Velebit mountain, halfway between the towns of Obrovac and Knin.

History 
According to the folk story, the monastery was built in 1317 by monks from Bosnia, with the financial support from the Serbian king Milutin. However, the monastery has older Gothic windows and Orthodox monastery was probably founded by immigrating monks only around 1642.

Supposedly during the reigns, King Stefan Dečanski and Emperor Dušan renovated the monastery. In the 15th and 16th centuries, the monastery was endowed by Saint Angelina of Serbia. Georgije Mitrofanović painted the walls in 1620–22. In the 1760s, Serbian writer and educator, Dositej Obradović, lived and worked in Krupa, while in the 1860s, major Serbian realist author, Simo Matavulj, lived and was educated in the monastery. Gerasim Zelić also lived there in the 18th century. It was completely renovated in 1855.

The surrounding konaks were burnt to the ground by the Ustaše during the World War II, who also destroyed the interior of the monastery turning it into their military post. In the 1950s the construction of the large belfry began but was never finished. After the outbreak of the Yugoslav wars in 1991, the well-known monastery treasury was displaced from Krupa. During the Operation Storm the monastery sustained damages in September 1995 and the local Orthodox Serbs, so as the priests, went into exile in Serbia. The belfry and the bells were damaged, so as the chapel  while the interior was looted and partially demolished. Since 2000, partial reconstruction of Krupa began. It included numerous works, such as the construction and painting of the small additional church (paraklis) and the partial adaptation of the unfinished belfry. Some of the artifacts were returned in 2010. Since the mid-2010s, the government of the Republic of Croatia also helped with the renovation of the monastery.

History of the monastery was written in the 18th century chronicles of the Bishop of Dalmatia, Simeon Končarević.

Characteristics 
The church of the Krupa monastery is dedicated to the Feast of the Dormition of Theotokos. In the monastery there are beautiful frescoes, a valuable collection of icons and parts of iconostasis and the collection of the several centuries old books.

See also 

 List of Serbian Orthodox monasteries
 Serbs of Croatia
 Krupa on Vrbas Monastery

References

Further reading

External links 

Serbian Orthodox monasteries in Croatia
Christian monasteries established in the 14th century
Christian monasteries established in the 17th century
14th-century Serbian Orthodox church buildings
17th-century Serbian Orthodox church buildings
Medieval sites in Croatia
Buildings and structures in Zadar County